The Anjanadri Hills in  lies in Hanumanahalli (which means Hanuma’s village) near to Hampi, Karnataka State, India. It is the birthplace of Hanuman. According to Sanātana Dharma, Hanuman was born to Anjana and thus Hanuman was also called Anjaneya, and his birthplace Anjaneyadri (Anjana's Hill).

The hill has a Hanuman temple at the top. It has about 575 steps.

The temple has a rock-carved idol of Lord Hanuman. There are also shrines of Lord Rama and Sita and Anjana Devi temple in the vicinity.

References

Hanuman temples
Hindu temples in Koppal district
Hills of Karnataka
Geography of Bellary district